Frank Wisbar (born Franz Wysbar 9 December 1899 – 17 March 1967) was a German film director and screenwriter. 

Born in Lithuania, Wisbar directed more than 20 films between 1932 and 1967 in Germany and the United States, as well as amassing many television credits. He created TV's Fireside Theatre and was the show's producer in addition to frequently directing and writing episodes. He was also a member of the jury at the 10th Berlin International Film Festival.

Selected filmography

 Spell of the Looking Glass (1932)
 Anna and Elizabeth (1933)
 Rivalen der Luft (1934)
 Hermine and the Seven Upright Men (1935) (awarded in the Third Reich, cf. Nazism and cinema)
The Unknown (1936)
 Fährmann Maria (1936) 
 Ball at the Metropol (1937)
 Secrets of a Sorority Girl  (1945)
 Strangler of the Swamp (1946)
 Devil Bat's Daughter (1946)
 Lighthouse (1947)
  (1957)
 Nasser Asphalt (1958)
 Stalingrad: Dogs, Do You Want to Live Forever? (1959)
 Darkness Fell on Gotenhafen (1959)
  (1960)
 Barbara (1961)
 The Legion's Last Patrol (1962)
  (1963)
  (1966, TV film)

References

External links

1899 births
1967 deaths
People from Tilsit
People from East Prussia
German mass media people
Best Director German Film Award winners